The United States District Court for the District of Utah (in case citations, D. Utah) is the federal district court whose jurisdiction is the state of Utah.  The court is based in Salt Lake City with another courtroom leased in the state courthouse in St. George.

Appeals from the District of Utah are taken to the United States Court of Appeals for the Tenth Circuit (except for patent claims and claims against the U.S. government under the Tucker Act, which are appealed to the Federal Circuit).

The United States Attorney's Office for the District of Utah represents the United States in civil and criminal litigation in the court.  the United States Attorney is Trina A. Higgins.

Current judges 

:

Vacancy and pending nomination

Former judges

Chief judges

Succession of seats

See also 
 Courts of the United States
 List of current United States district judges
 List of United States federal courthouses in Utah
 United States Bankruptcy Court for the District of Utah

References

External links 
 United States District Court for the District of Utah Official Website
 District of Utah Federal Court Practice blog

Utah
Utah law
Buildings and structures in Salt Lake City
Ogden, Utah
1894 establishments in Utah Territory
Courthouses in Utah
Courts and tribunals established in 1894